Precious Hearts Romances Presents is a 5-day Philippine program broadcast on ABS-CBN. It mainly focuses on adaptations of the best-selling paperbacks distributed by company holder Precious Hearts Romances from May 4, 2009, to September 27, 2019.

Precious Hearts Romances Presents Episodes

Season 1

Bud Brothers

Finale: Each one of the men finds a girl for themselves.

Ang Lalaking Nagmahal Sa Akin

Somewhere In My Heart

My Cheating Heart

Season 2

Impostor

Midnight Phantom

Kristine

Alyna

Mana Po

Season 3

Lumayo Ka Man Sa Akin

Hiyas

Pintada

Paraiso

Season 4

Araw Gabi

Los Bastardos

Special Episodes

Quikilig: Ma-iikling Kwento ng Pag-ibig (Quikilig: Short Love Stories)

Love Is Only in the Movies

The Substitute Bride

You're Mine, Only Mine

Lumang Piso Para sa Puso

Love Me Again

References

Lists of Philippine drama television series episodes